Allan Andersson (4 March 1931 – 10 May 2010) was a Swedish cross-country skier. He competed in the men's 30 kilometre event at the 1960 Winter Olympics.

Cross-country skiing results

Olympic Games

World Championships

References

External links
 

1931 births
2010 deaths
Swedish male cross-country skiers
Olympic cross-country skiers of Sweden
Cross-country skiers at the 1960 Winter Olympics
People from Krokom Municipality